Rösch is a surname. Due to the diacritics, it is sometimes rendered internationally as Roesch or Rosch.

People named Rösch include

 Augustin Rösch (1893–1961), German Jesuit
 Eberhard Rösch (born 1954), former German biathlete, father of Michael
 Hans Rösch (born 1914, date of death unknown), German bobsled
 Josef Rösch (1925–2016), radiologist
 Michael Rösch (born 1983), German-Belgian biathlete, son of Eberhard
 Otto Rösch (1917-1995) Austrian Secretary of State
 Peter Rösch (1930–2006), Swiss football defender
 Wolfgang Rösch (born 1959), German Catholic priest, vicar general of Limburg

People named Roesch include

 Angelika Roesch (born 1977), German professional tennis player
 Kurt Roesch (1905–1984), German born American painter

German-language surnames
Surnames from nicknames